Daniel Dicks Guice Jr. (born June 6, 1953) was an American businessman and politician.

Born in Biloxi, Mississippi, the elder son of Daniel Guice, who served as Mayor of Biloxi and was a member of the Mississippi House of Representatives.

Guice Jr. graduated from the University of Mississippi. He then received his master's degree from the University of Southern Mississippi. He was the Gulf Coast Director for the Associated General Contractors of Mississippi.

From 1984 to 2008, Guice Jr. served in the Mississippi House of Representatives.

Notes

1953 births
Living people
Politicians from Biloxi, Mississippi
People from Ocean Springs, Mississippi
University of Southern Mississippi alumni
University of Mississippi alumni
Businesspeople from Mississippi
Members of the Mississippi House of Representatives